Neenah Foundry is a manufacturing company in the north central United States, based in Neenah, Wisconsin. The company manufactures cast iron manhole covers, gratings, and similar items for municipal and construction applications. Neenah Enterprises, Inc. manufactures iron castings for the heavy truck, agriculture, construction, and related markets.

History
Neenah Foundry was established  in 1872 by William Aylward, Sr., as Aylward Plow Works. The name was changed to Aylward and Sons in 1904 and to Neenah Foundry Co. in 1922. In 2003, the company filed for bankruptcy. In 2010, the foundry's parent company again filed for and emerged from bankruptcy.

Charlotte Pipe and Foundry Company announced that effective July 13, 2022 the Company has purchased Neenah Enterprises, Incorporated, headquartered in Neenah, Wisconsin. Neenah operates three plants which manufacture construction and industrial castings. The Neenah plant locations are Medley, Florida, Neenah, Wisconsin and Lincoln, Nebraska.

A major customer over the years is the city of Chicago, and Neenah Foundry manholes and other products can be found in all 50 US states and 17 foreign cities.

See also
East Jordan Iron Works

References

Further reading

External links

Companies established in 1872
Foundries in the United States
Goods manufactured in the United States
Ironworks and steel mills in the United States
Manufacturing companies based in Wisconsin
Companies based in Wisconsin